Kalai Vendhan is a 2015 Indian Tamil-language action drama film written and directed by R. K. Parasuram. The film stars Ajay and Sanam Shetty in the lead roles. It was released on 7 August 2015.

Plot
Kalai (Ajay) becomes a teacher of the martial art form, vovinam, under training of his guru (Thalaivasal Vijay) at a martial arts school. Malar (Sanam Shetty) visits the school to meet her friend, and became acquainted with Kalai. Over time, the pair fall in love.

Malar's mother is against her daughter's choice of boyfriend. It is later revealed that Malar has been kidnapped, which Kalai sets out to resolve.

Cast 

 Ajay as Kalai
 Sanam Shetty as Malar
 Kalabhavan Mani as Panneerselvam 
 Manobala
 T. P. Gajendran
 Anu Mohan
 Thalaivasal Vijay
 Nalini
 Yuvarani
 Aarthi
 Manju
 S. Kamalakannan
 Sampath Ram
 Dhandapani
 Kadhal Sukumar
 Nellai Siva
 Ambani Shankar

Production 
The core theme of the film was based on the Vietnamese martial art called Vovinam. Sanam Shetty signed up to play dual roles in the film - that of a traditional girl from the 1970s and a modern-day college student. Sanam appeared in action scenes for the first time in her career and performed stunts without a stunt double. The action scenes in the film was shot in the forests surrounding Madurai.

Soundtrack 
The soundtrack was composed by Srikanth Deva.

Release and reception 
The film was released on 7 August 2015. A reviewer from The New Indian Express wrote that "A weak script, lackluster narration and insipid performances ensure that the film falls in the to-be-missed-list". A reviewer from Maalai Malar gave the film a negative review, criticising most aspects of the film-making. A critic from the entertainment portal Iflicks.in gave the film a positive review, noting the director "has made efforts to make a complete entertainer with a story that focuses on self-defense martial arts."

References 

2010s Tamil-language films
2015 films
Indian action drama films
2015 romance films